Milecastle 4 (Westgate Road) was a milecastle of the Roman Hadrian's Wall.  Its remains exist beneath the Newcastle Arts Centre at 67-75 Westgate Road.  This position is some way away from its predicted position which is at these coordinates:   The actual location is between the predicted positions of Turrets 4A and 4B, which has led to suggestions that the numbering and positioning of milecastles and turrets on this part of Hadrian's Wall should be reconsidered.

Construction 
Milecastle 4 was a long-axis milecastle of unknown gateway type.  Such milecastles were thought to have been constructed by either the legio VI Victrix who were based in Eboracum (York), or the Legio XX Valeria Victrix who were based in Deva Victrix (Chester).

There was evidence to suggest that the southern gateway had been blocked at some time.

Excavations and investigations
1929 and 1930 - Roman pottery was discovered  along the line of the wall from Milecastle 3.  This was taken to be the site of Milecastle 4.

1961 - Birley accepts the above location.

1985 - The south-west corner of the milecastle was found, and further excavation took place. No occupational layer was discovered and the foundations were sealed by a layer containing predominantly 2nd century pottery fragments, meaning it is likely that the milecastle was demolished before the end of the 2nd century.

Associated turrets 
Each milecastle on Hadrian's Wall had two associated turret structures.  These turrets were positioned approximately one-third and two-thirds of a Roman mile to the west of the Milecastle, and would probably have been manned by part of the milecastle's garrison.  The turrets associated with Milecastle 4 are known as Turret 4A and Turret 4B, however the established milecastle position is between the supposed turret positions.

Turret 4A
Nothing is known of Turret 4A.  Due to the discovery of Milecastle 4 further west than the measured position of this turret, there is no monument record or assumed position.

Turret 4B
Nothing is known of Turret 4B.  Due to the discovery of Milecastle 4 further west than the measured position of Turret 4A, it is extremely unlikely that the positions assumed by Birley were accurate.  However, a monument record exists for that location.

Location:

Monument records

References

Bibliography

Breeze, David J (1934) Handbook to the Roman Wall. Reprint, Newcastle upon Tyne: Society of Antiquaries, 2006.
Harbottle B., Fraser R., Burton F.C., Dore J.N., Casey P.J., Huntley J.P. (1988) 'The Westgate Road Milecastle, Newcastle upon Tyne, Society for the Promotion of Roman Studies' Brittania, 19, pp. 153–162.
Breeze D.J. and Dobson B. (1976) Hadrian's Wall, London: Allen Lane.

04